The son of Bob Fontaine Sr., Bob Fontaine Jr. is a scout for the Toronto Blue Jays of Major League Baseball. He formerly scouted for the San Diego Padres from 1974 to 1980. He was the Montreal Expos west coast scouting director in 1982, and he was the scouting director for the California/Anaheim Angels from 1987 to 1999. He was the Director of Player Development for the Chicago White Sox from 2001 to 2003, and he was the scouting director for the Seattle Mariners from 2004–2008.  As of  he is a member of Toronto's professional scouting department.

References

Living people
California Angels executives
California Angels scouts
Chicago White Sox executives
Chicago White Sox scouts
Montreal Expos scouts
Seattle Mariners executives
San Diego Padres scouts
Toronto Blue Jays scouts
Year of birth missing (living people)